Miguel Angueira was an acrobatic rock'n'roll dancer from France, multiple world champion. Together with his partner Natasha Quoy he has held number one place in the World Rock'n'Roll Confederation ranking list.

Partners
 Dorothée Blanpain
 Clarisse Solbes
 Natasha Quoy
 Helen Trickleby

Titles
 1990 (Amateur) World Champion (together with Dorothée Blanpain)
 1991 World Champion (together with Dorothée Blanpain)
 1992 World Champion (together with Dorothée Blanpain)
 2005 European Champion (together with Natasha Quoy)
 2006 European Champion (together with Natasha Quoy)
 2008 European Champion (together with Natasha Quoy)
 2010 European Champion (together with Helen Trickleby)

Videos
 World Championship 2006 Schaffhausen - Miguel Angueira& Natasha Quoy Acrobatic
 World Championship 2006 Schaffhausen - Miguel Angueira& Natasha Quoy Foot technique
 French National Championship 2006 - Miguel Angueira& Natasha Quoy Acrobatic
 World Masters Competition 2005 Winterthur - Miguel Angueira& Natasha Quoy Acrobatic
 Miguel Angueira and Dorothée Blanpain - early nineties Foot technique
 Miguel Angueira and Natasha in the French TV Show Incroyable Talent

References

External links
 World Ranking List Rock'n'Roll (Main Class) as of April 30, 2007
 Overview Rock'n'roll Titles hickoksports.com
 WRRC Result List European Championship 2005 WRRC Result List European Championship 2005
 Result List European Championship 2006 in Sisak, Croatia
 Homepage of www.rocknroll.fr with reference to Miguel Angueira and Natasha Quoy
 L'Eviedanse Dance Studio in Loriol-du-Comtat, near Avignon, France, where Angueira teaches several dance classes
 Ambiance Caliente Dance Association in Laudun (Gard, France) where Angueira teaches Rock'n Roll and Salsa

Competitive dancers
French male dancers
Living people
Year of birth missing (living people)
Place of birth missing (living people)